Jorge Mota Faial Delgado (born 24 June 1991), known as Elber Binha or just Elber, is a Cape Verdean footballer who plays as a goalkeeper for the Angolan club Interclube. A one-time international for the Angola national team, Elber Binha plays for the Cape Verde national team.

Professional career
Elber Binha spent his entire senior career in Angola in the Girabola. He began his senior career with Primeiro de Maio in 2014, with stints at Benfica Luanda, Kabuscorp and Petro de Luanda. He was a candidate for Goalkeeper of the Year and Championship Player of the Year with Petro de Luanda in 2021. On 31 December 2021, he transferred to Interclube signing a 2-year contract.

International career
Elber Binha is a youth international of Cape Verde, having represented the Cape Verde U21s in 2009. He spent his entire senior playing career in Angola, and was naturalized as a citizen. He debuted with the Angola national team in a 1–1 friendly tie with Iran on 30 May 2014. He switched to represent the Cape Verde national team in 2022. He debuted with Cape Verde in a friendly 6–0 win over Liechtenstein on 25 March 2022.

Honour
Benfica Luanda
Taça de Angola: 2014

References

External links
 
 

1991 births
Living people
Sportspeople from Praia
Cape Verdean footballers
Cape Verde international footballers
Angolan footballers
Angola international footballers
Cape Verdean emigrants to Angola
Naturalized citizens of Angola
Angolan people of Cape Verdean descent
Dual internationalists (football)
Estrela Clube Primeiro de Maio players
S.L. Benfica (Luanda) players
Kabuscorp S.C.P. players
Atlético Petróleos de Luanda players
G.D. Interclube players
Girabola players
Association football goalkeepers